Saint Aquilina of Thessalonica (also spelled Akylina) was an 18th-century Greek Orthodox Christian saint and martyr.
She was born in  Zagliberi, a village near Thessalonica in Greece at a time when Greece was under the rule of the Ottoman Empire. When she was a baby her father accidentally killed a Muslim neighbour, and converted to Islam in order to escape execution.

However, Aquilina's mother raised her as a Christian. When she reached the age of eighteen, the Ottoman authorities pressured her father to make her convert to Islam as well. When she refused, she was arrested and beaten to death on September 27, 1764. Her relics were hidden by Christians to avoid desecration, and were only discovered in 2012, in the nearby town of Ossa, Thessaloniki. She is commemorated as a saint in the Eastern Orthodox Church, with feast day on September 27.

References 

Year of birth missing
1764 deaths
Christians executed for refusing to convert to Islam
New Martyrs
18th-century Greek people
Saints of Ottoman Greece
People from Thessaloniki (regional unit)
Greek saints of the Eastern Orthodox Church
18th-century Greek women